Robert Sloman (c. 1898 – December 1970) was an English rugby union and professional rugby league footballer who played in the 1920s.

Background
Bob Sloman was born in Plymouth, Devon, England, and he died aged 72 in
Plymouth, Devon, England

Playing career

International honours
Bob Sloman won caps for England while at Oldham in 1923 against Wales, in 1924 against Other Nationalities, in 1925 against Wales, in 1926 against Wales, in 1928 against Wales, and won caps for Great Britain while at Oldham in 1928 against Australia (3 matches), and New Zealand (2 matches).

Bob Sloman was selected for Great Britain while at Oldham for the 1924 Great Britain Lions tour of Australia and New Zealand, he did not play in any of the Test matches on this tour.

Championship final appearances
Bob Sloman played right-, i.e. number 12, in Oldham's 2–13 defeat by Wigan in the Championship Final during the 1921–22 season at The Cliff, Broughton on Saturday 6 May 1922, in front of a crowd of 26,700.

County League appearances
Bob Sloman played in Oldham's victory in the Lancashire County League during the 1921–22 season.

Challenge Cup Final appearances
Bob Sloman played left-, i.e. number 11, in Oldham's 4–21 defeat by Wigan in the 1923–24 Challenge Cup Final during the 1923–24 season at Athletic Grounds, Rochdale on Saturday 12 April 1924, in front of a crowd of 12,000. played left-, i.e. number 11, in the 16–3 victory over Hull Kingston Rovers in the 1924–25 Challenge Cup Final during the 1924–25 season at Headingley Rugby Stadium, Leeds, in front of a crowd of 41,831, played right-, i.e. number 12, in the 3–9 defeat by Swinton in the 1925–26 Challenge Cup Final during the 1925–26 season at Athletic Grounds, Rochdale, in front of a crowd of 28,500, and played left-, i.e. number 11, and scored a try in the 26–7 victory over Swinton in the 1926–27 Challenge Cup Final during the 1926–27 season at Central Park, Wigan, in front of a crowd of 27,800.

County Cup Final appearances
Bob Sloman played left-, i.e. number 11, in Oldham's 10–0 victory over St Helens Recs in the 1924 Lancashire County Cup Final during the 1924–25 season at The Willows, Salford on Saturday 22 November 1924, in front of a crowd of 15,000.

Club career
Bob Sloman changed rugby football codes from rugby union to rugby league when he transferred from Plymouth Albion R.F.C. to Oldham during August 1921.

References

External links
Statistics at orl-heritagetrust.org.uk
Bob Sloman - Genial all-rounder who coupled a career at The Sunday Times with writing for Dr Who and the West End stage

1890s births
1970 deaths
England national rugby league team players
English rugby league players
English rugby union players
Great Britain national rugby league team players
Oldham R.L.F.C. captains
Oldham R.L.F.C. players
Plymouth Albion R.F.C. players
Rugby league players from Devon
Rugby league second-rows
Rugby union players from Plymouth, Devon